Sebastian J. L. Barrie is a former defensive end and tackle in the National Football League.

Biography
Barrie was born on May 26, 1970 in Dallas, Texas.

Career
Barrie was a member of the Green Bay Packers during the 1992 NFL season. After a year away from the NFL, he joined the Arizona Cardinals for the 1994 NFL season, and the San Diego Chargers the season after that.

He played at the collegiate level at Liberty University and Prairie View A&M University.

See also
List of Green Bay Packers players

References

Green Bay Packers players
Arizona Cardinals players
San Diego Chargers players
American football defensive ends
American football defensive tackles
Liberty Flames football players
Prairie View A&M Panthers football players
Living people
1970 births
Players of American football from Dallas